Davis Courneyea, better known by his alias Review Raja, is a Canadian film critic, who reviews Indian films from the Tamil film industry. He became popular through his YouTube channel "ReviewRaja", where his team regularly posts film reviews in the English language combined with satirical film sequences of the Tamil film in question. His production team consists of college friends and colleagues. Among them are two Tamils, Rajeev Kugan and Arjun Mano, who introduced him to Tamil cinema. As the popularity of Review Raja grew, he got offers from the Tamil film and television industry. However, Review Raja targets mainly non-Tamil audiences as his often repeated motive is "bringing Tamil cinema to the world."

Biography

Personal life 
Review Raja's real name is Davis Courneyea. He was born in the small town of Tweed, Ontario, in Canada and grew up in Belleville. He graduated 2011 in retail management at Ryerson University. He lives in Toronto working as an IT consultant. In Who is Review Raja? he talks about his family. Both parents, Shawna and Richard, live in Ontario and he has a two years older sister Destiny. His father is an entrepreneur, who has been frequently traveling to India since 1991.

Film critiquing 

Review Raja became a good friend of Rajeev Kugan, who worked in the same downtown IT company. In the summer of 2012 he met with Kugan and Kugan's high school friend Arjun Mano, a film student at Centennial College, and decided to watch  Billa (2007), starring Ajith Kumar. Being unfamiliar with Tamil, or Indian, films before, Review Raja was impressed by the action sequences of the film, stating "It was like nothing I had seen before. I found the action sequences really amazing. Ajith punches someone and they go flying across the room!" Later, Kugan and Mano brought him to Woodside Cinemas in Toronto, where for the first time he experienced watching Tamil film among Tamil film goers, "I was shocked, People were hugging each other, running up and down the aisles, throwing popcorn and candy in the air. Just because Ajith had walked (into the shot)." As there was a dearth of English language reviewers of Tamil films on YouTube, Kugan had the idea to promote Review Raja as an English reviewer of Tamil films.

Review Raja made his film critic debut on July 19, 2012, by posting a video on the popular trailer of Billa II (2012), in which he mentions that he watched Mankatha (2011) as well. Five days later a fully fledged film critic on Saguni (2012) was uploaded, where he used his 5-point rating system for the first time, giving Saguni 3.5/5 stars. Here he also introduced his film certificate punch line "This is Review Raja certified." In Who is Review Raja? he revealed, that he is relying on subtitles when watching Tamil films, and that he planned to learn the language. Additionally he revealed the organization of his team consisting of director and editor Rajeev Kugan, cinematographer Arjun Mano, visual effects and 3D supervisor Wes MacDonald, a sound engineer and Chennai-based musician Udaya Bharathi. The Review Raja logo was created by Kugan's brother Sanjeev. They use Adobe After Effects, Final Cut Pro X, Cinema 4D, Adobe Photoshop and a Canon EOS 5D Mark II camera.

In September 2012, Review Raja opened the Tamil Short Film Contest with a 30 minutes limit for each film with English subtitles, and received 60 submissions by November 4. Later, Team Review Raja decided to make a special video dedicated to the then worldwide Korean song phenomenon Gangnam Style. Kugan mixed it with the A. R. Rahman-composed song "Style" from the soundtrack of Sivaji (2007) under his musical pseudonym dJ.icykle using Sony ACID Pro along with Adobe Audition. The video became a hit by crossing 400.000 views within a few months and is currently the most viewed video by Review Raja. From Pizza Movie Review HD on, Review Raja changed the rating system from the current 5 points to the more accurate 10 points rating system, due to public complains on past reviews.  In Thuppakki Music Video HD Review Rani was introduced, who made her film critic debut in Podaa Podi Movie Review HD as Review Raja thought the film was a "chick-flick and I wanted to see how a girl would gauge Silambarasan as an actor."

Review Raja made his official debut in Tamil cinema with Venkat Prabhu's Biriyani (2013), in which he was cast to act in a dance number choreographed by Shobi.

Media coverage 
After a couple of weeks of their existence, Review Raja won the Ottawa Rickshaw's online voting contest to feature a free advertisement on their rickshaws to spread Tamil cinema awareness. Taking notice of the rising popularity, Galatta, a South Indian film magazine, arranged a partnership with Review Raja. Review Raja came the first time in contact with Tamil film stars, when he welcomed the Aadhi Bhagavan film crew at Toronto Pearson International Airport. The team around Ameer Sultan, Jayam Ravi, Neetu Chandra, Yuvan Shankar Raja and Ganesh Venkatraman were posing and chatting with Review Raja in front of the media. A growing number of Indian newspaper companies featured stories about Review Raja. In February 2013, Review Raja left Toronto to visit Chennai, where he was interviewed by the leading English newspaper The Hindu and met numerous Tamil film personalities, including Vijay, Gautham Vasudev Menon, Venkat Prabhu, Yuvan Shankar Raja and Prabhu Deva. He also met Rekhs, an English subtitle specialist for Tamil films, on whom Review Raja relies on when he watches Tamil films. The Canadian Broadcasting Corporation (CBC) featured him in the news show The National  and in Ontario Morning of CBC Radio One, where Review Raja announced that he would be a jury member of the 7th Vijay Awards, presented by the News Corporation-owned Indian Tamil television channel STAR Vijay.

List of reviewed films

10 points rating system (current)

5 points rating system

Special features

Filmography

Notes

References

External links
 
 Ottawa Rickshaws Gallery

Film review websites
Canadian film critics
Entertainment-related YouTube channels
Living people
Year of birth missing (living people)
Indian film websites
English-language YouTube channels
YouTube channels launched in 2016